is a private junior college in Takahashi, Okayama, Japan, established in 1967. The predecessor of the school was founded in 1966.

See also 
 Kibi International University

External links
  

Educational institutions established in 1966
Private universities and colleges in Japan
Japanese junior colleges
Universities and colleges in Okayama Prefecture
1966 establishments in Japan